Pop Unknown is an American rock band from Austin, Texas formed in 1997 
by ex members of  Mineral (Gabe Wiley) and Tim Lasater of Feed Lucy. They released their debut EP Summer Season Kills  in 1999 and followed it with their first full-length album If Arsenic Fails, Try Algebra later that year both on Deep Elm Records. Between 1997 - 2002, Pop Unknown toured the US over a dozen times and found a welcome audience in Europe, playing shows in Germany, Italy, France, Spain, Austria, Switzerland, Sweden, Belgium, the UK among others. In 2002 they released a second album titled The August Division on now defunct Sessions Records. In 2003 the 4 of the members of Pop Unknown founded a side project called 'Kissing Chaos' which became the primary band and Pop Unknown was ended
.

The four members of Pop Unknown that made up the band Kissing Chaos, (Joel, Gabriel, Matt and Erick) played many shows and toured the US. After releasing an EP the band called it quits.

Singer Tim Lasater went on to form The Cutaway in the US. After releasing their debut EP 'Ready For The Fall', The Cutaway – not to be confused with the UK band of the same name – toured extensively in the Texas region and the US, but called it quits after drummer Ed Davis left to play with Juliette Lewis and the Licks.

Band members
Current members

 Tim Lasater - vocals, guitars, keyboard
 Joel Ganucheau - guitar, vocals
 Matt Breedlove - guitar
 Erick Sanger - bass
 Adrian Carrillo - drums

Former members
 Gabe Wiley - drums
 Casper Eckols - bass
 Chepo Pena - bass
 Frances Garcia - guitar, keyboard
 Shane Wells - bass

References 

American emo musical groups
Emo musical groups